Thomas J. Quigley (1905 – 1960) was the Superintendent of Schools in the Roman Catholic Diocese of Pittsburgh, Pennsylvania from 1939 - 1955. He is the namesake of Quigley Catholic High School.

Archbishop John B. McDowell, then Superintendent of Diocesan Schools, at the dedication of Quigley Catholic High School in April, 1968, had this to say about Quigley:

This extraordinary priest served the diocese, its schools, and the general community as a spiritual leader and an accomplished educator from 1931 until his death in 1960. No man gave so much to education or to the Church as did he.

References

1905 births
1960 deaths
Christianity in Pittsburgh
Religious leaders from Pittsburgh
20th-century American Roman Catholic priests